Jordan Parks (born 6 April 1994) is an American professional basketball player for Reyer Venezia Mestre of the Italian Lega Basket Serie A (LBA) and the EuroCup.

During the 2019-20 season, Parks finished as the second-leading scorer in Serie A2 with Orlandina Basket with 23 points per game. He joined Universo Treviso Basket in 2019 and averaged 8.5 points per game. Parks signed with Basket Napoli on June 27, 2020.

On July 16, 2022, Parks signed with Reyer Venezia Mestre of the Lega Basket Serie A and the EuroCup.

The Basketball Tournament
Jordan Parks played for DC On Point in the 2018 edition of The Basketball Tournament. He scored 7 points and had 7 rebounds in the team's first-round loss to Armored Athlete.

References

External links
 
 ESPN profile
 North Carolina Central Eagles bio

1994 births
Living people
American expatriate basketball people in Germany
American expatriate basketball people in Italy
American men's basketball players
Basketball players from New York City
College of Central Florida Patriots men's basketball players
Forwards (basketball)
Junior college men's basketball players in the United States
Lega Basket Serie A players
North Carolina Central Eagles men's basketball players
Orlandina Basket players
Pallacanestro Treviso players
Pallacanestro Trieste players
Reyer Venezia players
Sportspeople from Staten Island
Telekom Baskets Bonn players
Universo Treviso Basket players
Napoli Basket players